The Richard E. Dill House, off SR 53 (formerly SR 76) in Alexandria, Nebraska, is a Modern Movement house built in 1936.  It was designed by self-trained engineer and architect Richard E. Dill.  It was listed on the National Register of Historic Places in 1973.  The house is the first successful application of "concrete modular construction" in a residence, in particular the first use of "Prestressed channel plank modules" patented by Dill.

References

External links 
More photos of the Richard E. Dill house at Wikimedia Commons

Houses on the National Register of Historic Places in Nebraska
Houses completed in 1936
Houses in Thayer County, Nebraska
Modern Movement architecture in the United States
National Register of Historic Places in Thayer County, Nebraska